A school breakfast club is a provision for children to eat a healthy breakfast in a safe environment before their first class.  The term "breakfast club"  is commonly used to describe such facilities in the United Kingdom.

Breakfast clubs generally enhance both academic performance and behavior, especially for children whose parents might not otherwise be able to afford to provide them with regular meals.  Breakfast provision is however less prevalent compared with school lunch, both in the UK and worldwide. As of 2013, only about half the school children in the UK had access to a breakfast club.

Attendance of a breakfast club is not mandatory; many parents prefer to feed their children at home.  The clubs are often run by schools, but can also be community run.  Schools themselves are the most common location for breakfast clubs, but they can also be found in churches, community halls or even commercial premises. Breakfast clubs are sometimes open to children from more than one school.

History
The earliest known modern advocate for school dinners was Count Rumford in the late 18th century. School dinners became more widely available in the 19th and 20th century, though generally only lunch was provided. This began to change after the introduction of the Oslo breakfast in 1932, an uncooked meal of nutritional ingredients. Between the wars the Oslo breakfast became famous worldwide; claims were widely reported that it helped children fed on it grow several inches taller than they would otherwise. Similar initiatives were launched in several countries across the world. In the United States, a major step forward in the provision of breakfast for schoolchildren was the 1966 launch of the  School Breakfast Program.

In the UK, breakfast clubs were introduced in the 1990s, driven not just by concern for children's nutrition but by parental demand for a supervised place to leave their children in the early morning.  Changes in gender roles and more demanding workplaces meant an increasing number of women were no longer able to look after their children until the start of school.  By 1999 there were over 700 breakfast clubs operating in the UK.   After the lasting global inflation in the price of food that began in late 2006, there were increased efforts to set up new breakfast clubs, in part due to greater awareness of children who arrived at school suffering from hunger, a condition that reduced their ability to concentrate and sometimes led to disruptive behavior.  A 2011 report by Kellogg's found that the number of breakfast clubs had increased to over 20,000, though also that several thousand had or were at risk of closure due to lack of funds.
  In 2013 a survey of 552 staff for the Association of Teachers and Lecturers found that just over half those questioned said their school provided a breakfast club.
The Conservative's 2017 election manifesto had included a promise to provide free school breakfasts to all primary school children, though by 2018 this had been abandoned. Yet a commitment remains for the government to provide £26 million extra funding for new and existing breakfast clubs.

UK breakfast clubs were fully closed as part of the lockdown imposed for the COVID-19 pandemic. (As opposed to schools, which in the UK were left partly open, to cater for the children of front-line workers.)  A May 2020 report stated that 621,000 British children had been accessing free breakfast clubs before the pandemic, yet only 136,000 were receiving an alternative following the lockdown.

Structure
There is no standard model for a breakfast club.  Some are run by and physically located in schools.  Others are run by community groups, businesses or churches, or by a combination of such actors working in partnership. Some clubs make a small charge for breakfast, providing them free only to those who qualify for free school meals. Other clubs provide free breakfasts for all children, to avoid those from poor families suffering from stigmatization. Guidance, funding and general support for running breakfast clubs in the UK is available from a number of sources, including from County Councils, the charity Magic Breakfast, and the food companies Greggs  and Kellogg's.  Breakfast clubs typically  stay open for between 45 minutes to 1 hour 15 minutes, and close before the children's first morning lesson. Sometimes the clubs are staffed by volunteers, though sometimes there are paid caterers, and clubs in schools can be supervised by teachers or support staff.

Benefits
Breakfast clubs can be especially valuable for children whose parents are not able to afford to provide them with regular morning meals.  They can provide both short- and long-term health benefits. Children who receive breakfast often perform better at learning, and can also be better behaved. Breakfast clubs can also improve the child's long-term health by providing a well balanced nutritious meal.  Secondary benefits of breakfast clubs include improving attendance, helping to prevent disadvantaged children from experiencing social isolation, and helping with children who would otherwise not have adult supervision in the first hour or so before school. A significant majority of teachers hold the view that school breakfast clubs are beneficial in achieving educational goals.. For example,  in a 2013 survey of 552 teachers,  387  (71%) said they believed breakfast clubs have a positive effect on pupil's concentration,  but four teachers (0.7%) said it had a negative impact. Questioned about the impact on behavior,  325 (60.2%) were positive, while 11 (2%) said breakfast clubs have a negative effect.

Various studies in both the U.S and Europe, some dating back to the 20th century, found that breakfast provision at schools boost pupil's educational attainment. Older studies have been criticised for their methodology however.  Some studies also found evidence of negative behaviour effects, and even that in certain circumstances a majority of children were unhappy with breakfast clubs: when either there was insufficient care given to ensure the clubs were stimulating enough to avoid boredom,  or when access had been restricted just to poorer children, which could leave participants feeling picked on.

A 2016 report, funded by the Education Endowment Foundation and the Department for Education, based on research by the National Children's Bureau and the Institute for Fiscal Studies, found that free school breakfast clubs can boost children's educational attainment by as much as two months. The study found the benefits arose not just from the eating of a nutritious breakfast, but from also from attending the club itself. In FY 2018, the balanced breakfast program for school children, which by this point was managed by the United States Department of Agriculture, had expanded to 2.4 million children in the United States. Approximately 14.7 million students received free or reduced-price breakfasts in FY 2018 and 2019. These numbers were a significant increase from FY 1989, when 3.8 million students received free or reduced price breakfasts on a given school day, and a total of 658 million school breakfasts were served.  Federal spending on the school breakfast program in the United States also increased three percent in FY 2019 compared to the previous fiscal year.

See also

 Free school meal
 Hunger in the United Kingdom
 List of breakfast topics
 School meal
 School meals initiative for healthy children
 Supper club

Notes and references

External links
 Round up of breakfast related  research by Mr Breakfast

Breakfast club
Academic meals
Free meals